Anastasiia Hotfrid (also transliterated Anast'asia Got'pridi, born 25 April 1996) is a Ukrainian-born Georgian weightlifter who competes in the +75 kg division. She placed 12th at the 2015 World Championships and at the 2016 Olympics. She won a gold medal at the 2016 European Championships, and gold at the 2017 World Weightlifting Championships.

Career

Hotfrid was born in Ukraine and is married to the Ukrainian weightlifting coach and former Olympic weightlifter Denys Hotfrid. In Ukraine she is coached by her father, as her husband does not want her to compete in weightlifting. In 2015, because of a conflict within the Ukrainian weightlifting team, she moved to Georgia. Her family remains in Ukraine, and hence she spends her time between the two countries.

References

External links

 
 
 
 
 

1996 births
Living people
Ukrainian female weightlifters
Female weightlifters from Georgia (country)
Olympic weightlifters of Georgia (country)
Weightlifters at the 2016 Summer Olympics
World Weightlifting Championships medalists
European Weightlifting Championships medalists
Ukrainian emigrants to Georgia (country)
Naturalized citizens of Georgia (country)
People from Snizhne
Sportspeople from Donetsk Oblast